Andree or Andrée is a feminine given name.

Variants and derivations by language 

 Andrée : French, English
 Andréanne : French
 Andréane : French
 Andrea: Albanian, Italian, Latin, masculine; Croatian, Czech, Danish, English, Finnish, French, Galician, German, Hungarian, Icelandic, Italian, Macedonian, Norwegian, Romanian, Slovak, Spanish, Swedish, feminine
 Andréa : French and Portugueuse 
 Dédée : French
 Andréana : Malagasy
 Andrette : French, English
 Andretta : Italian
 Andréina : French
 Andréline : French, haitian creole

Compound given name 

 Andrée-Anne
 Anne-Andrée
 Marie-Andrée

Given name
Notable people with the name include:
 Andree Anderson ( 1950s), American ice dancer
 Andrée Belle, French painter
 Andrée Bernard (born 1966), English television actress
 Andrée Blouin (1921–1986), activist and writer from the Central African Republic
 Andrée Boisson (1900–1973), French fencer
 Andrée Bonhomme (1905–1982), Dutch composer
 Andree Bonifacio (born 2002), Canadian-Filipino dancer, actress, and singer; former member of hip-hop dance duo group The Lucky Aces
 Andrée Borrel (1919–1944), French heroine of World War II
 Andrée Bosquet (1900–1980), Belgian painter
 Andrée Boucher (1937–2007) Canadian politician from Quebec
 Andrée Brendheden (born 1983), Swedish ice hockey forward
 Andrée Brunet (1901–1993), French figure skater
 Andrée Chedid (1920–2011), French poet and novelist of Lebanese descent
 Andrée Christensen (born 1952), Canadian writer and visual artist
 Andrée Clair (1916–1982), French writer and ethnographic studier of Niger
 Andree Connors, American poet and novelist
 Andrée Damant, French actress
 Andrée de Jongh (1916–2007), Belgian resistance leader in World War II 
 Andrée van Es (born 1953), Dutch politician
 Andrée Esposito (born 1934), French opera singer
 Andrée Ferretti (born 1935), Canadian political figure and author
 Andrée Feix (1912–1987), French film editor and film director
 Andrée Flageolet ( 1961), French racing cyclist
 Andrée Geulen-Herscovici (1921–2022), Belgian Holocaust rescuer
 Andreé González (born 1975), Venezuelan footballer
 Andrée Howard (1910–1968), British ballet dancer and choreographer
 Andrée Jeglertz (born 1972), Swedish football manager and player
 Andrée Laberge (born 1953), Canadian researcher and writer
 Andrée Lachapelle (1931–2019), French Canadian actress
 Andrée Lafayette (1903–1989), French stage and film actress
 Andrée Lavieille (1887–1960), French painter
 Andrée Lescot (1950s–1960s), Haitian singer, showgirl, and soprano
 Andrée Maillet (1921–1995), Canadian writer 
 Andrée Marlière (1934–2008), Belgian ballet dancer and painter
 Andrée Marquet (born 1934), French organic chemist
 Andrée Mégard (1869-1952), French actress, stage beauty
 Andrée Melly (born 1932), English actress
 Andrée A. Michaud (born 1957), Canadian novelist and playwright
 Andrée Peel (1905–2010), French resistance member of World War II
 Andrée Putman (1925–2013), French interior and product designer
 Andree Layton Roaf (1941–2009), American lawyer and jurist from Arkansas
 Andrée Rosenfeld (1934–2008), Belgian rock art researcher and archaeologist
 Andrée Rosier (born 1978), French chef
 Andrée Ruellan (1905–2006), American artist
 Andrée Ruffo, Canadian judge from Quebec
 Andrée Sfeir-Semler (born 1953), Lebanese art historian and gallery owner
 Andrée Tainsy (1911–2004), Belgian actress
 Andrée Vaurabourg (1894–1980), French pianist and teacher
 Andrée Viollis (1870–1950), French journalist and writer
 Andrée Watters (born 1983), Canadian musician
 Andree Welge (born 1972), German darts player
 Andree Wiedener (born 1970), German footballer

See also
 Andree (surname)
 Andrée (disambiguation)
 Marie-Andrée, given name
 André, given name

Feminine given names
French feminine given names
English feminine given names